Spinners is the third studio album recorded by American R&B group The Spinners, produced by Thom Bell and released in April 1973 on the Atlantic label.  The album was the group's first for Atlantic after leaving Motown.

History
Spinners includes their first American top-ten and R&B number-one hit "I'll Be Around", along with the successful songs "Could It Be I'm Falling in Love", "One of a Kind (Love Affair)", "Ghetto Child", and "How Could I Let You Get Away". The album was also the second of fourteen straight studio albums to make the Billboard 200, and their first in the Top-twenty, as it reached #14 on the charts. Additionally, it was their first of three consecutive R&B albums chart-toppers – and the second to hit those charts overall.

Thom Bell created a sound for the group that was "lush" yet gritty. Bell's insistently soulful orchestral arrangements played perfectly to their harmonic strengths. "Could It Be I'm Falling In Love" (later a hit for David Grant and Jaki Graham) is the keynote; sung by Smith, it is beautiful, optimistic and upbeat. Often cited as the birth of the Philadelphia Sound, Spinners yielded five American top 100 hits, and two UK chart successes."

Track listing

Personnel
Billy Henderson, Bobby Smith, Philippé Wynne, Henry Fambrough, Pervis Jackson – vocals
Roland Chambers, Norman Harris, Bobby Eli – guitars
Thom Bell – pianos 
Ronnie Baker – bass guitar
Don Renaldo – strings
Earl Young – drums
Larry Washington – congas, bongos
Vince Montana – vibes, marimbas
MFSB – orchestration
Jack Faith – alto saxophone, flute
Rocco Bene, Bobby Hartzell – trumpet
Joe DeAnglis, Robert Martin– French horn
Freddie Joiner, Bobby Moore, Richie Genevese, Eddie Keskarella – trombone
Linda Creed, Barbara Ingram, Carla Benson, Yvette Benton – backing vocals

Production
Thom Bell – producer, arranger, conductor
Joe Tarsia – recording engineer, re-mix engineer
Merrill A. Roberts, Jr. – photography
Loring Eutemey – album design

Charts

Singles

See also
List of number-one R&B albums of 1973 (U.S.)

References

External links
 

1973 albums
The Spinners (American group) albums
Albums arranged by Thom Bell
Albums produced by Thom Bell
Albums recorded at Sigma Sound Studios
Atlantic Records albums